KWIT (90.3 FM) is the National Public Radio member station for Sioux City, Iowa and northwestern Iowa. It airs a mix of NPR programming and classical music.  Owned by Western Iowa Tech Community College, it operates a full-time satellite, KOJI (90.7 FM) in Okoboji, Iowa. It is the largest NPR station in Iowa that is not a part of Iowa Public Radio.

KWIT signed on for the first time on January 31, 1978.  Prior to then, most of the area got grade B coverage from WOI in Ames, and from KUSD in Vermillion, South Dakota.

After several years of branding as "KWIT-KOJI", in 2017 it adopted the on-air name "Siouxland Public Media".

External links
 KWIT official website

NPR member stations
WIT